This is a list of all the United States Supreme Court cases from volume 333 of the United States Reports:

 Le Maistre v. Leffers, 
 Fong Haw Tan v. Phelan, 
 Johnson v. United States, 
 United States v. Brown, 
 Bob-Lo Excursion Company v. Michigan, 
 Johnson v. United States, 
 Maggio v. Zeitz, 
 Musser v. Utah, 
 Chicago and Southern Air Lines, Inc. v. Waterman Steamship Corporation, 
 Seaboard Air Line Railroad Company v. Daniel, 
 Funk Brothers Seed Co. v. Kalo Inoculant Co., 
 Woods v. Cloyd W. Miller Co., 
 Fisher v. Hurst,  (per curiam)
 King v. Order of United Commercial Travelers of America, 
 Suttle v. Reich Brothers Construction Company, 
 United States v. Baltimore and Ohio Railroad Company, 
 Donaldson v. Read Magazine, Inc., 
 Cole v. Arkansas, 
 Illinois ex rel. McCollum v. Board of Ed. of School Dist. No. 71, Champaign Cty., 
 In re Oliver, 
 United States v. Line Material Co., 
 United States v. United States Gypsum Co., 
 Mitchell v. Cohen]], 
 Mogall v. United States,  (per curiam)
 Eccles v. Peoples Bank of Lakewood Village, 
 Bakery Drivers v. Wagshal, 
 Francis v. Southern Pacific Company, 
 Woods v. Stone, 
 United States v. Evans, 
 Commissioner v. South Texas Lumber Company, 
 Winters v. New York, 
 Connecticut Mutual Life Insurance Company v. Moore, 
 Moore v. New York, 
 Parker v. Illinois, 
 Shade v. Downing, 
 Commissioner v. Sunnen, 
 Massachusetts v. United States, 
 Bute v. Illinois, 
 Federal Trade Commission v. Cement Institute, 
 Andres v. United States, 
 United States v. South Buffalo Railroad Company, 
 United States v. Scophony Corporation of America, 
 Anderson v. Atchison, Topeka & Santa Fe Railroad Company,  (per curiam)

External links

1948 in United States case law